...Re is a 2016 Indian Kannada comedy film written and directed by Sunil Kumar Desai. The film has an ensemble cast consisting of veteran actors: Ramesh Aravind, Anant Nag, Master Hirannaiah, Loknath, Shivaram, Tennis Krishna, Ramesh Bhat, Vaijanath Biradar, Sharath Lohitashwa, Suman, G. K. Govinda Rao among others. Harshika Poonacha and debutant actress Suman play female leads in the film. Ace cinematographer G S Bhaskar who has previously worked for Hollywood legends such has Richard Attenborough has handled the camera. Veteran music director Hamsalekha has composed the music for the film. The movie was initially titled Thandana Thandanana. Ananth Nag had revealed that the movie is thematically similar to Badal Sircar's play Ballabpurer Roopkatha.

About
In an interview with New Indian Express, the director  Sunil Kumar Desai said that the film revolves around the "'ifs' of our lives". Lead actor of the film Ramesh Aravind described the film as "an out of the box love story, which has deep meaning with weird characterisations". Anant Nag also felt that the movie had "serious messages" about Indian cultural heritage and Adi Shankara's Advaita philosophy. It has been touted as the comeback film of legends of Kannada cinema such as—director Sunil Kumar Desai, music director Hamsalekha and senior artists Loknath and Shivram. In an interview with the Times of India, Ramesh Aravind said that "Re" may seem like a film from the 70s or 80s and the "old world charm" of the film is intentional. The film makes a sweeping criticism at the state of open defecation in India.

Cast

 Ramesh Aravind as PaPu Babu Rao
 Anant Nag as Narayan Rao
 Harshika Poonacha as Parvathi
 Suman as Preethi Bhat
 Suman Nagarkar
 Ramesh Bhat
 Master Hirannaiah
 Loknath
 G. K. Govinda Rao
 Srinivasa Prabhu
 Shivaram
 Chi. Guru Dutt
 Sharath Lohitashwa
 Vaijanath Biradar
 Divya Shetty Shridhar as Shreya
 Mahesh Nethrekar
 PD Sathish Chandra
 Prashanth
 Tennis Krishna
 Mandeep Roy
 Chidanand

Production
Pre-production of this movie started in 2013 with the title “Thandana Thandanaana”. The film has been produced by Lokesh R under Sujana Creations banner and has mostly been shot in and around Bengaluru.

References

External links
 

2016 films
2010s Kannada-language films
Indian comedy films
Films scored by Hamsalekha
Films directed by Sunil Kumar Desai
2016 comedy films